Krzysztof Bulski (12 February 1987 – 17 December 2020) was a Polish chess player who held the FIDE title of Grandmaster (GM).

Chess career

Bulski was born in Częstochowa and learned to play chess at the age of seven. He was a multiple medalist at the Polish junior championships: silver in 2007 (U20) and twice bronze in 2001 (U14), 2006 (U20). In 2007 represented Poland at the World Junior Championship in Yerevan. He has won the Polish Blitz Team Championship on three occasions, in 2007, 2008 and 2009. In 2010 he made his debut in the Polish Championship.

In 2010, he shared first place with Marcin Tazbir in the Polish University Chess Championship in Poznań. In 2011, Bulski finished second in a round-robin tournament in Zaježová, Slovakia. In 2012, he won two silver medals in the  World University Chess Championship (individual and team classification) in Guimarães.

His highest FIDE rating of 2,554 was achieved in July 2012. He received his Grandmaster title from FIDE in September 2012. 

In 2013, Bulski came second in the Polish Blitz Chess Championship in Bydgoszcz. He has also competed successfully in several Polish Team Chess Championships (team gold in 2007, 2013, and silver in 2011, 2012, 2014). 

Bulski played for Poland on board three at the 2013 European Team Chess Championship, scoring 5/9 (+2–1=6).

He died on 17 December 2020 at the age of 33.

FIDE ratings

References

External links

 
 
 
 

1987 births
2020 deaths
Polish chess players
Chess grandmasters
People from Częstochowa
Place of death missing